A'yana Keshelle Phillips (born 1 September 1995) is a model and beauty pageant titleholder from both the British Virgin Islands & US Virgin Islands who was crowned Miss British Virgin Islands 2018 & Miss World US Virgin Islands 2019. She represented the British Virgin Islands in the 2018 Miss Universe pageant but unplaced. She also represented US Virgin Islands at Miss World 2019 pageant.

Miss British Virgin Islands 2017 

On 6 August 2017, Phillips finished as the 2nd Runner-up at Miss British Virgin Islands 2017 at the Multipurpose Sports Complex. She was one of the two contestants who shared the second runner-up position with Helina Hewlett. Meanwhile, the official winner was Khephra Sylvester crowned as the 2017 winner and competed at Miss Universe 2017 in Las Vegas, United States where she did not place in the top 16.

Miss British Virgin Islands 2018 
Phillips was crowned Miss British Virgin Islands 2018 at the coronation ceremony held on 5 August 2018 at the festival village. She succeeded outgoing Miss British Virgin Islands 2017 Khephra Sylvester.

Miss Universe 2018 
Phillips represented British Virgin Islands at Miss Universe 2018 pageant in Bangkok, Thailand but unplaced.

Miss World U.S. Virgin Islands 2019  
Phillips competed in Miss World USVI 2019 and won in October 2019. She succeeded Kyrelle Thomas.

Miss World 2019  
Phillips will represent the U.S. Virgin Islands at the Miss World 2019 pageant in London, UK.

References

External links
Official Miss British Virgin Islands website

Miss Universe 2018 contestants
1995 births
Living people
People from Tortola
Miss World 2019 delegates
British Virgin Islands beauty pageant winners
United States Virgin Islands beauty pageant winners